Aulacomnium is a genus of mosses of the family Aulacomniaceae, with a circumpolar distribution.

Species
Species currently accepted by The Plant List are as follows: 
Aulacomnium acuminatum (Lindb. & Arnell) Kindb.
Aulacomnium androgynum (Hedw.) Schwägr.
Aulacomnium arenopaludosum M.F. Boiko
Aulacomnium heterostichoides Janssens, D.G. Horton & Basinger
Aulacomnium heterostichum (Hedw.) Bruch & Schimp.
Aulacomnium palustre (Hedw.) Schwägr.
Aulacomnium papillosum (Müll. Hal.) A. Jaeger
Aulacomnium pentastichum Mont.
Aulacomnium stolonaceum Müll. Hal.
Aulacomnium turgidum (Wahlenb.) Schwägr.

References

Aulacomniaceae
Moss genera